Birgit Schielin (born March 22, 1979 in Vienna) is an Austrian rhythmic gymnast.

Schielin competed for Austria in the rhythmic gymnastics individual all-around competition at the 1996 Summer Olympics in Atlanta. There she was 24th in the qualification round and did not advance to the semifinal.

References

External links 
 
 

1979 births
Living people
Austrian rhythmic gymnasts
Gymnasts at the 1996 Summer Olympics
Olympic gymnasts of Austria
Sportspeople from Vienna